Prasanth Chandran, is an Indian cricketer, who has played 42 first-class matches between 2000 and 2008 for Kerala. Chandran completed training at MRF Pace Foundation and claimed 79 wickets for Kerala. Test players Vinod Kambli, Wasim Jaffer, Sairaj Bahutule and Ramesh Powar were his victims as he claimed seven for 71 against Mumbai, his career best, in the 2003 Ranji Trophy at the Wankhede Stadium. After retiring as a player, Chandran became a cricket coach at MRF Pace Foundation.

References

External links
 

  
1980 births
Living people
Kerala cricketers
Indian cricketers
South Zone cricketers
Cricketers from Kochi